Govandi is a railway station on the Harbour Line of the Mumbai Suburban Railway network. It has two platforms. One serves the line north to the Mankhurd railway station, while the others serves the southbound line to Chembur Railway Station.

Railway stations in Mumbai Suburban district
Mumbai Suburban Railway stations
Mumbai CR railway division